Paliampela or Paliambela ("old vineyards")  may refer to a number of places in Greece:

 Paliampela, Aktio-Vonitsa, a village and a community in Aktio-Vonitsa
 Paliampela, Amfilochia, a village and a community in Amfilochia
 Paliampela, Drama, a village in Paranesti
 Paliampela, Larissa, a village in Elassona
 Paliampela, Naupactus, a village and a community in Naupactus
 Paliampela, Pieria, a village in Pydna-Kolindros
 Paliampela, Thessaloniki, a village in Volvi